Airbiquity Inc. is a business-to-business (B2B) software development and engineering company operating in the automotive telematics industry. Airbiquity's business model is to develop, deploy, and support the ongoing management of connected car programs for automotive industry customers.

Airbiquity's Choreo platform is claimed by the company to integrate the broad array of components needed to build and operate connected car programs such as mobile network connectivity; vehicle entertainment systems or "head units", cabin displays and instrumentation; telematics control units (TCU), on-board diagnostic dongles (OBD-II), smart-phone handsets; back-office IT systems; data analytics providers; software and firmware catalogs;  emergency and concierge call centers; and content and service providers.

History  
The company was founded in 1997 as Integrated Data Communications Inc. located on Bainbridge Island across the Puget Sound from Seattle. In 2000, the company changed its name to Airbiquity Inc. and later relocated to the Seattle downtown waterfront in 2006.

During its early years Airbiquity's primary product was aqLink, a patented in-band software modem enabling vehicle connectivity and two-way data transfer over cellular voice networks using embedded TCUs or consumer cell phones with Bluetooth connections. The introduction of aqLink was followed by a series of product upgrades and line extensions, including aqServer for transmission, receipt and processing of information transported to data and call center providers over UMTS, CDMA, TDMA or GSM wireless network voice channels.

In 2001, Airbiquity secured a contract with General Motors to license aqLink technology to support location-based communications for its OnStar service. Other automakers licensed aqLink technology for their connected car programs. According to Airbiquity, aqLink technology has been licensed for use in over 25 million production vehicles globally. The ability to provide voice and data services marked the start of branded connected car programs from automakers seeking to differentiate their vehicles from competitors. These programs have since expanded to include other features and services such as over-the-air (OTA) software and data management, infotainment delivery, remote vehicle management, electric vehicle management, and commercial fleet management.

OTAmatic 
One of the services Airbiquity offers is called OTAmatic. It provides over-the-air (OTA) software and data management to automotive manufacturers and suppliers. In December 2018, Airbiquity announced a new version of OTAmatic. This update will include new security and data analytics features as well as new OTA management capabilities, such as the ability to carry out multi-ECU software updates and data campaigns.

Prior Offerings

 aqLink
 aqServer
 Fleet Management
 Safety & Security
 Electric Vehicle
 Infotainment Delivery

Choreo
Airbiquity launched Choreo, a cloud-based connected car service delivery platform, in 2008. The first automaker program to deploy on Choreo was Ford Sync in 2008. Airbiquity provides service delivery for Choreo in over 60 countries, including translations into more than 30 local languages

Choreo is composed of six services for established and newly emerging connected car services. Each product draws upon combinations of Choreo platform service delivery capability supplemented with custom software development and engineering to integrate with specified suppliers, mobile network operators, call centers, content providers, and back-end IT systems.

Awards 
Airbiquity has received the following telematics industry, technology, and business awards for software development, engineering and integration expertise, and general business success:
 Business Intelligence Group - New Product of the Year - 2017
 Stratus Award for Cloud Computing - 2017
 TU-Automotive - Best Telematics Service Provider – 2015
 Deloitte - Deloitte Technology Fast 500 – 2014 & 2013
 Connected World - Connected World 100 – 2014 & 2013
 Inc. Magazine - Inc. 500/5000 – 2014 & 2013
 Edison Universe - Innovative Safety & Security Services – 2014
 Intelligent Transportation Society of America - Solution Spotlight: Electric Vehicle – 2013
 Red Herring - Top 100 North America – 2013
 Telematics Update - Best Telematics Solution – 2012/11
 Telematics Update - Best Automotive Application – 2012/11

References 

Software companies of the United States
1997 establishments in the United States
Software companies established in 1997
Companies established in 1997